Mountain Station is a New Jersey Transit station in South Orange, Essex County, New Jersey, United States, along the Morris and Essex (formerly Erie Lackawanna Morristown Line). The station, built in 1915, was designed by Frank J. Nies. It has been listed in the New Jersey Register of Historic Places and National Register of Historic Places since 1984 and is part of the Operating Passenger Railroad Stations Thematic Resource.

Station layout and service
The station is somewhat unusual in that when the Lackawanna Railroad rebuilt the Morristown Line during the 1910s and 1920s, to eliminate grade crossings between Newark and Millburn, Mountain Station was the only location at which the elevation of the railroad's roadbed was not changed. As a result, the grade crossing of Montrose Avenue at the eastbound end of the station was eliminated and the roadway was raised onto a bridge. At the westbound end of the station, the Mountain House Road crossing was eliminated entirely and a pedestrian walkway was built. The walkway was removed during the late 1970s as part of the re-electrification project for the line.

At present, as in the past, most trains that stop here proceed onto, or have originated in, Hoboken. Most Midtown Direct trains into New York City bypass Mountain Station, but a large number do stop at the main station in South Orange, which is less than a mile to the south (timetable west). Midtown Direct trains can be accessed from Mountain Station by transferring at an intermediate station.

See also 
 List of New Jersey Transit stations
 Operating Passenger Railroad Stations Thematic Resource (New Jersey)
 National Register of Historic Places listings in Essex County, New Jersey

Notes

References

External links

 Montrose Avenue entrance from Google Maps Street View

NJ Transit Rail Operations stations
Railway stations in Essex County, New Jersey
Railway stations on the National Register of Historic Places in New Jersey
Former Delaware, Lackawanna and Western Railroad stations
South Orange, New Jersey
Renaissance Revival architecture in New Jersey
Railway stations in the United States opened in 1915
National Register of Historic Places in Essex County, New Jersey
1915 establishments in New Jersey